Kim Kwang-jin (born  in Ansan) is a South Korean freestyle skier, specializing in halfpipe.

Kim competed at the 2014 Winter Olympics for South Korea. He placed 25th in the qualifying round in the halfpipe, failing to advance.

As of April 2014, his best showing at the World Championships is 29th, in the 2011 halfpipe.

Kim made his World Cup debut in August 2012. As of April 2014, his best World Cup finish is 18th, at Calgary in 2013–14. His best World Cup overall finish in halfpipe is 35th, in 2013–14.

Education
Dankook University
Namyangju Donghwa High School

References

External links

1995 births
Living people
Olympic freestyle skiers of South Korea
Freestyle skiers at the 2014 Winter Olympics
People from Ansan
South Korean male freestyle skiers
Dankook University alumni
Universiade medalists in freestyle skiing
Universiade silver medalists for South Korea
Competitors at the 2015 Winter Universiade
Freestyle skiers at the 2012 Winter Youth Olympics
Sportspeople from Gyeonggi Province